Khamani Griffin (born August 1, 1998) is an American actor. He is best known for portraying Bobby James on the UPN/The CW sitcom All Of Us as well as Tolee in the animated television series Ni Hao, Kai-Lan. He starred as Ben Hinton in Daddy Day Care (2003) and appeared in Grey's Anatomy, ER, and My Name Is Earl. He has been nominated for three Young Artist Awards for Daddy Day Care and All of Us.

He also made an appearance in Lil' Kim's music video for her song "Download". Khamani had a main role on the popular game show Are You Smarter Than a 5th Grader? until its series finale on September 18, 2009.

Filmography

Film

Television

Other
Trix – Kid #2

External links
 
 Khamani Griffin cast bio on The CW

1998 births
Living people
21st-century African-American people
21st-century American male actors
African-American male actors
American male child actors
American male film actors
American male television actors
American male voice actors
Male actors from Oakland, California